George Lagogianes is a Canadian television personality, best known as a longtime reporter and anchor for CP24.

Lagogianes graduated from Ryerson Polytechnical Institute with a bachelor's degree in radio and television arts. After graduation, he began work in 1988 as a camera operator for local Toronto television station Citytv and national music network MuchMusic, which at the time were both owned by CHUM Limited. He became a "videographer" for the CityPulse news programme in 1989, subsequently becoming a host and reporter for the national Bravo! arts network. He also served as co-host of the national dance music series Electric Circus, and as an interviewer for Citytv's MovieTelevision.

He debuted on CP24 in 2008 as co-host with Ann Rohmer of Live at 5, remaining with the program until its format was changed in 2010, and then anchored other programs including CP24 Breakfast. He announced his retirement from broadcasting in December 2022 and jokingly said he would work at Costco to be a greeter and get a discount at the retail store. With his last day anchoring on CP24 slated to be December 29.

References

External links
 www.cp24.com

Living people
Year of birth missing (living people)
Canadian people of Greek descent
Canadian television news anchors
Toronto Metropolitan University alumni
People from Owen Sound